"A Love Bizarre" is a song written by Prince and Sheila E. The song is a duet between both singers and it appears on Sheila E.'s 1985 album Romance 1600. It clocks in at 12:16, but the single version is 3:46 in duration. It made its debut in the music movie Krush Groove.

The song was a major hit and reached #1 on the Urban radio airplay and Dance/Club play charts. On other American charts, "A Love Bizarre" went to #2 on the U.S. R&B charts and #11 on the Billboard Hot 100 and Pop radio airplay charts. The German 12" single release is backed by the B-side "Save the People" which also served as the B-side for her previous single "Sister Fate". She performed the song as part of Ringo Starr & His All-Starr Band during their 2001, 2003 and 2006 tours.

Music video
The club scene from Krush Groove in which Sheila E. and her band are performing the song was used for the majority of the music video with a few scenes from the film edited in. The music video uses the song's single edit.

Chart positions

Formats and track listings
U.S. 7"
 "A Love Bizarre" – 3:46
 "A Love Bizarre (Part II)" – 3:50

U.S. 12" promo
 "A Love Bizarre" (LP version) – 12:18
 "A Love Bizarre" (edit) – 3:46

German 12"
 "A Love Bizarre (Parts I and II)" – 7:36
 "Save the People" – 8:28

See also
 List of number-one dance hits (United States)

References

Sheila E. songs
Prince (musician) songs
1985 singles
Male–female vocal duets
Songs written by Prince (musician)
Songs written by Sheila E.
Song recordings produced by Prince (musician)
1985 songs
Warner Records singles